Clipper Gap (also, Clippergap) is an unincorporated community in Placer County, California. It lies at an elevation of 1676 feet (511 m).

The Clipper Gap post office opened in 1866, changed its name to Clippergap in 1894, reverted its name to Clipper Gap in 1950, and closed permanently in 1960.

References

Unincorporated communities in California
Unincorporated communities in Placer County, California
1866 establishments in California